The electoral district of Croydon is an electoral district of the Victorian Legislative Assembly in Australia. It was created in the redistribution of electoral boundaries in 2013, and came into effect at the 2014 state election.

It largely covers the area of the abolished district of Kilsyth, covering outer eastern suburbs in Melbourne. It includes the suburbs of Croydon, Mooroolbark, Ringwood North, Kilsyth and Bayswater North.

The abolished seat of Kilsyth was held by Liberal MP David Hodgett, who retained the new seat at the 2014 election.

Members

Election results

Graphical summary

References

External links
 District profile from the Victorian Electoral Commission

Croydon, Electoral district of
2014 establishments in Australia
City of Maroondah
Yarra Ranges
Electoral districts and divisions of Greater Melbourne